Litozamia latior is a species of sea snail, a marine gastropod mollusk in the family Muricidae, the murex snails or rock snails.

Description

Distribution

References

  Verco, J.C. 1909. ''Notes on South Australian marine Mollusca with descriptions of new species. Part XII; Transactions of the Royal Society of South Australia v. 33 (1909)

Litozamia
Gastropods described in 1909